The 1986 Asian Club Championship was the 6th edition of the annual Asian club football competition hosted by Asian Football Confederation. Several Asian clubs started the qualifying round in Fall of 1986.  The final round was held in Riyadh, Saudi Arabia in December 1986.

Furukawa Electric FC (JPN) became the first Japanese club to win the Asian Championship.

First round

Group 1

As  Al-Shorta Aden were the only team entered, the Group was scratched and Al-Shorta Aden qualified.

Group 2

Group 3
Qualification from the 1986 GCC Champions League held in Riyadh.
Participants:  Al-Hilal,  Al Arabi,  Dhofar,  Al-Arabi,  Al-Wasl.
 Al-Hilal &  Al-Arabi qualified

Group 4
Participants:  Malavan F.C.,  Saunders SC,  HBL FC,  Victory SC.

Known results: 

Malavan F.C. and  Saunders SC qualified.

Group 5

Note: both matches were played in Kuala Lumpur.

Group 6
(Played in Brunei)
Participants: Krama Yudha Tiga Berlian,  Philippine Air Force,  Daerah Brunei.
 Krama Yudha Tiga Berlian qualified

Group 7

Bye: Furukawa Electric FC (qualified automatically)

Group 8
Tournament played in Hong Kong.

Lucky-Goldstar Hwangso (SKo) withdrew on the morning of their match against Hap Kuan due to visa and logistical issues.

Therefore, the match between them and South China was scratched, and South China and Hap Kuan both qualified.

Second round

Group A

All matches were played in Baghdad, Iraq.

Group B

All matches were played in Saudi Arabia.

Group C

All matches were played in Hong Kong.

Group D

All matches were played in Kuala Lumpur, Malaysia.

Final round

References

Asian Club Competitions 1987 at RSSSF.com

1986 in Asian football
Asian Club Championship seasons
Asian Club Championship, 1986
International club association football competitions hosted by Saudi Arabia